Allan Taylor (1 December 1905 – 1981) was an English professional footballer who played for North Shields, Newcastle United, South Shields, Tottenham Hotspur and Hartlepool United.

Football career
Taylor began his career at his local Non league club North Shields before joining Newcastle United in 1925. The goalkeeper signed for South Shields in 1926 where he played in 34 matches. In 1931 he joined Tottenham Hotspur, between 1931–1936 he featured in 70 matches in all competitions for the Spurs. After leaving White Hart Lane he went on to play for Hartlepool United where he made a further 25 appearances before ending his playing career.

References

1905 births
1981 deaths
Date of death missing
Sportspeople from North Shields
Footballers from Tyne and Wear
English Football League players
Association football goalkeepers
North Shields F.C. players
Newcastle United F.C. players
South Shields F.C. (1889) players
Tottenham Hotspur F.C. players
Hartlepool United F.C. players
English footballers